Luigi "Gigi" Angelillo (20 December 1939 – 21 July 2015) was an Italian actor, voice actor and theatre director.

Biography
Angelillo began an acting career on stage and screen in the 1960s and during the 1980s. He appeared in more than 20 films from 1966 to 2012 and he became well known to the Italian public as a voice dubber. From 1987 to 1995, he was the official Italian voice of Scrooge McDuck and he has performed other voice acting work for Disney. He has dubbed Wallace Shawn, Ronald Lacey and John Candy in a select number of their films.

Personal life
Angelillo was married to fellow actress and voice actress Ludovica Modugno until his death in 2015.

Death
Angelillo died on 21 July 2015, after suffering a long illness. He was 75 years old.

Filmography

Cinema
Tesoro mio (1979)
Giovanni Falcone (1993)
Cuore Sacro (2005)
Romanzo Criminale (2005)
The Family Friend (2006)
Cado dalle nubi (2009)

References

External links 
 
 
 

1939 births
2015 deaths
Italian male film actors
Italian male voice actors
Italian male stage actors
Italian theatre directors
Gioia del Colle